Dougie McCracken (21 July 1964 – 5 May 2011) was a Scottish professional footballer who played as both a defender and a forward.

Career
Born in Kilwinning, McCracken made 140 appearances in the Scottish Football League for Ayr United, Dumbarton and East Fife.

Later life and death
McCracken was found dead in his house on 5 May 2011. He was the step-father of F1 driver Paul di Resta.

References

1964 births
2011 deaths
People from Kilwinning
Footballers from North Ayrshire
Association football defenders
Association football forwards
Scottish footballers
Ardrossan Winton Rovers F.C. players
Ayr United F.C. players
Dumbarton F.C. players
East Fife F.C. players
Largs Thistle F.C. players
Scottish Football League players
Suicides in Scotland